Danie is a given name. Notable people with the name include:

Danie Brits, retired South African professional wrestler and former South African Heavyweight Champion
Danie Coetzee (born 1977), South African rugby union footballer
Danie Craven (1910–1993), former Western Province, Eastern Province, Northern Transvaal and Springbok rugby union player
Danie G. Krige, South African Mining Engineer who pioneered the field of geostatistics
Danie Gerber (born 1958), former South African rugby union player, who played for South Africa between 1980 and 1992
Danie Keulder (born 1973), former Namibian cricketer
Danie Mellor (born 1971), Indigenous Australian artist, winner of the 2009 National Aboriginal & Torres Strait Islander Art Award
Danie Rossouw (born 1978), South African rugby union footballer who plays as a loose forward
Danie Visser (born 1961), former professional tennis player from South Africa
Danie Voges, retired South African professional wrestler who is a former 2-time South African Heavyweight Champion

See also
Danie Craven Stadium, multi-purpose stadium at Coetzenburg in Stellenbosch, South Africa
Danie Theron Medal, South African military decoration that was in use from 1970 to 2003

Feminine given names
Masculine given names

fr:Danie